Basilica Peak is a granite peak,  high, located  southeast of Mount Gorton in the southern part of the Wilson Hills in Antarctica. It was mapped by the United States Geological Survey (1962–63) and the New Zealand Geological Survey Antarctic Expedition (1963–64), and named by the latter expedition because of its basilica-like shape.

References 

Mountains of Oates Land